HMS Chesterfield was a 44-gun fifth-rate ship of the line of the Royal Navy, which saw active service in both the War of Jenkins' Ear and the Seven Years' War. Launched in 1745 during a period of war with France, Chesterfield was assigned to the fleet on patrol in the Western Approaches to the British Isles, and later to the protection of British interests in West Africa. Her crew mutinied in October 1748, but returned the vessel to Navy control in early 1749.

Decommissioned in 1749, Chesterfield was restored to service when Britain declared war on France in 1755 for duty in the Mediterranean, North America and the Caribbean. After several years of convoy duty she was wrecked in the Old Bahama Channel, near Cuba, on 24 July 1762.

References

Bibliography
 

1745 ships
Ships built in Rotherhithe
Individual sailing vessels
Ships of the line of the Royal Navy